William Pitts may refer to:
 William S. Pitts, American physician and composer
 William Pitts II, English silver-chaser and sculptor

See also
 William Pitt (disambiguation)